Pádraig Delaney (born 1999) is an Irish hurler who plays for Laois Senior Championship club The Harps and at inter-county level with the Laois senior hurling team. He usually lines out at as a left wing-back.

Honours

Laois
Joe McDonagh Cup (1): 2019

References

External links
Pádraig Delaney profile at the Laois GAA website

1999 births
Living people
Harps hurlers
Laois inter-county hurlers